Hartwig's soft-furred mouse or Hartwig's praomys (Praomys hartwigi) is a species of rodent in the family Muridae.
It is found only in Cameroon.
Its natural habitat is subtropical or tropical moist montane forest.
It is threatened by habitat loss.

References

Endemic fauna of Cameroon
Praomys
Mammals described in 1968
Taxonomy articles created by Polbot
Fauna of the Cameroonian Highlands forests